Cross v. United States, 242 U.S. 4 (1916), was a United States Supreme Court case regarding remuneration for clerks of the court for the copying and docketing of naturalization claims.

Prior History

Appellant Cross, a federal court clerk, filed a claim against the United States to be paid fees for making triplicate copies of original declarations of intention for naturalization and attaching the seal of the court to the same. The United States Court of Claims (then simply the Court of Claims) denied his claim. The clerk appealed.

Holding
Justice White wrote the opinion of the court:

A charge by a clerk of a Federal district court of fees for making, on the direction of the Bureau of Immigration and Naturalization, triplicate copies of original declarations of intention for naturalization, and attaching the seal of the court, is not authorized by the general provisions of U. S. Rev. Stat. 828, since if the duty to render such services was expressly commanded by the Naturalization Act of June 29, 1906, the right to charge therefore would be clearly forbidden by the prohibitory provision of §21, such services not having been included in the enumeration of fees in §13.

See also
List of United States Supreme Court cases, volume 242

References

External links
 

1916 in United States case law
United States Supreme Court cases
United States Supreme Court cases of the White Court
United States administrative case law
United States immigration and naturalization case law